Holbrook is a town in Norfolk County, Massachusetts, United States. , the town's population was 11,405.

History 

Holbrook was first settled by Europeans (mostly British colonists) in 1710 as the southern part of Old Braintree, and was officially incorporated on February 29, 1872, the last town created from the former lands of Braintree.  It used to be known as East Randolph, being divided from Randolph by track from the Old Colony Railroad line.

In the 18th and 19th centuries, farming and cottage trades, particularly shoe production, dominated the economy.  Slowly, the town evolved into a primarily residential community with many residents commuting to work in Boston proper and the primary employment within the town being in service industries.

Some residents served during the Civil War, and members of the famed 54th Massachusetts Volunteer Infantry are buried in Union Cemetery.  The impact of the War came not only from the residents' direct participation in the conflict, but was also from the need for production of boots for soldiers.  It was during the Civil War that shoe production became a significant component of the town's economic life, and production moved decidedly from the home and into factories.

The story of Holbrook's split from Randolph begins in 1871, when pressure had been building in East Randolph for an independent town. After a little "misunderstanding" (according to Randolph brethren, the Eastern group used rather stronger language) about the placement of a cupola on top of Stetson Hall as a vent for the gas lighting, the pot boiled over and East Randolph petitioned to be incorporated as a separate town.

The town was named for benefactor Elisha N. Holbrook, who provided the town with the funds for the town hall and library upon incorporation.

Holbrook residents again took up arms in the First and Second World Wars.  The latter had a great impact on the life of the community.  After 1945, demobilization created a building boom and altered the economy and lifestyle across the United States.  Holbrook experienced a housing boom and became a largely residential community, in which some service industry provides local jobs, but from which most residents commute to work in Greater Boston.

Holbrook once held the Baird and McGuire chemical plant, which in 1982 was added to the EPA National Priorities list. Listed as the nation's 14th worst Superfund site, cleanup work began immediately. As of June 17, 1997, the EPA concluded primary cleanup operations at the site. Efforts included the incineration of 248,000 tons of soil, including sediment dredged from the Cochato River. Total cost was approximately $133 million, including the construction of a water treatment plant that is still in operation.

Geography
According to the United States Census Bureau, the town has a total area of 7.4 square miles (19.2 km2), of which, 7.3 square miles (19.0 km2) of it is land and 0.1 square miles (0.1 km2) of it (0.69%) is water.

Holbrook borders Braintree to the north, Weymouth to the east, Abington to the southeast, Brockton to the southwest, Randolph and Avon to the west.

Demographics

At the 2000 census, there were 10,785 people, 4,076 households, and 2,853 families residing in the town. The racial makeup of the town was 91.87% White, 3.99% Black or African American, 0.19% Native American, 1.50% Asian, 0.01% Pacific Islander, 1.11% from other races, and 1.34% from two or more races. Hispanic or Latino of any race were 2.38% of the population.

There were 4,076 households, of which 29.2% had children under the age of 18 living with them, 54.2% were married couples living together, 11.9% had a female householder with no husband present, and 30.0% were non-families. 25.1% of all households were made up of individuals, and 11.2% had someone living alone who was 65 years of age or older. The average household size was 2.63 and the average family size was 3.19.

The age distribution was 23.0% under the age of 18, 7.1% from 18 to 24, 31.0% from 25 to 44, 22.8% from 45 to 64, and 16.1% who were 65 years of age or older. The median age was 38 years. For every 100 females, there were 94.1 males. For every 100 females age 18 and over, there were 91.0 males.

The median household income was $54,419, and the median family income was $62,532. Males had a median income of $43,134 versus $35,305 for females. The per capita income for the town was $23,379. About 4.3% of families and 6.4% of the population were below the poverty line, including 6.3% of those under age 18 and 8.9% of those age 65 or over.

Education

John F. Kennedy Elementary School (K–5)

Holbrook Middle High School (6–12)

Infrastructure

Transportation
Principal highways are Routes 37 and 139, which intersect at the center of the town.

Commuter rail service to South Station, Boston, is available on the Middleboro line from the Holbrook/Randolph Rail Station.

Holbrook is a member of the Massachusetts Bay Transportation Authority (MBTA), which provides fixed bus route service to Quincy Center, Braintree Station, and Montello Commuter Rail Station in Brockton. Holbrook is served by the 230 Bus from Quincy Center Station. The MBTA also provides THE RIDE, a paratransit service for the elderly and disabled. The 238 and 240 buses operate from Holbrook-Randolph Station on the town line, which provides access to Quincy Center MBTA Station, Avon, and Ashmont MBTA station.

Notable people

 Elihu Adams, Brother of President John Adams and a Minuteman in the Continental Army
 Andrew Card, Former White House Chief of Staff under George W. Bush (Jan. 20, 2001 – April 14, 2006)
 George Mason Lovering, Recipient of the Medal of Honor
 Jim Mann, Professional baseball player
 Joe Pernice, Indie rock singer/songwriter, leader of Pernice Brothers and Scud Mountain Boys
 Michael Sullivan, Former United States Attorney for the District of Massachusetts

References

External links

 Town of Holbrook website
 Holbrook Historical Society home page
Holbrook Public Library

 
1710 establishments in Massachusetts
Populated places established in 1710
Towns in Massachusetts
Towns in Norfolk County, Massachusetts